Jonathan Buck may refer to:

  Jonathan Buck (Bucksport) (1719–1795), founder of Bucksport
 Jon B. (1974– ), singer